Two ships of the Royal Navy have been named HMS Obdurate:

 , an  launched in 1916 and sold in 1921.
 , an O-class destroyer launched in 1942 and scrapped in 1964.

References
 

Royal Navy ship names